The Medical College of Chile (also known as Colmed) is a professional association of Chilean physicians. According its statutes the Chilean Medical College has the objectives of promoting the improvement, protection, development and rationalization of the profession. Izkia Siches has been its president since 2017.

Former presidents include Ricardo Vacarezza, Enrique Accorsi, Juan Luis Castro, Pablo Rodríguez, and Enrique Paris.

References

Professional associations based in Chile
Medical associations based in South America
Medical and health organisations based in Chile